was a Japanese engineer inducted into the Japan Automotive Hall of Fame who originally worked for Prince Motor Company then later moved to Nissan. After graduating from Yokohama National University, Sakurai worked for the Shimizu Corporation before he was given the opportunity to work in the Japanese automotive industry, which was his first intent. He later joined Prince as a chassis engineer in 1952, and was heavily involved in the development of the first generation Nissan Skyline (also called the Prince Skyline). He continued to head the Nissan Skyline project long after the Nissan takeover, headed the Nissan MID4 project, and was appointed President of Autech (a Nissan subsidiary) in 1986. He continued to work in the automotive field up until his death.

Sakurai died of heart failure on January 17, 2011.

History
The following sentences are based on the four sources stated in the "References" section.

April 3, 1929 - Born in Totsuka-ku, Yokohama.
March 1951 - Graduated from the Yokohama National University.

April 1951 - Joined the machine department of the Shimizu Corporation.
October 1952 - Joined the design department of the Tama Motor Company. (The manager was Jiro Tanaka and the assistant manager was Takuya Himura.)
November 1952 - The Tama Motor Company changed its name to the Prince Motor Company.

April 1954 - The Prince Motor Company was merged with the Fuji Precision Industries. (The name Prince Motor Company disappeared in the meantime.) The senior design manager was Ryoichi Nakagawa.
February 1961 - The Fuji Precision Industries changed its name to the Prince Motor Company. (The name "Prince Motor Company" revived.)
September 1963 - The assistant manager of the vehicle development group No. 1 of the passenger car department.
June 1965 - The assistant manager of the vehicle development group No. 2 of the vehicle technology department No. 1.
August 1966 - The Prince Motor Company was merged into the Nissan Motor Company. Assigned as the assistant manager of the vehicle development group No. 2, the vehicle technology department No. 1, the Prince division, the Nissan Motor Company.
January 1968 - The manager of the vehicle development group No. 2 of the design department No. 4.
January 1970 - The manager of the vehicle development group No. 8 of the design department No. 4.
January 1971 - Attached to the vehicle development department No. 3.
February 1974 - The chief vehicle coordinator of the vehicle development department No. 3.
February 1976 - The deputy manager of the vehicle development department No. 3.
January 1979 - The chief vehicle coordinator of the product developmentment office.
January 1980 - The senior manager and the chief vehicle coordinator of the product developmentment office.
February 1984 - The senior manager of the vehicle developmentment control department, the product developmentment office.
January 1986 - The senior manager of the technical vehicle design department.
October 1986 - The president of the Autech.
April 1989 - The part-time instructor of the Osaka Sangyo University.
December 1994 - The president of the S&S Engineering.
October 1995 - The part-time instructor of the Tokai University.
May 2005 - Inducted to the Japan Automotive Hall of Fame.
August 2006 - The chairman of the S&S Holdings.
October 2008 - The chairman of the Lenz Environmental Resources.
July 2010 - The chairman of the S&S Engineering.
January 17, 2011 - Died in Setagaya, Tokyo.

Death
Shinichiro Sakurai died of heart failure on January 17, 2011.

See also

 Prince R380
 Nissan R381
 Nissan R382
 Nissan R383
 Nissan Laurel C31
 Nissan Leopard F30
 Nissan MID4
Autech Zagato Stelvio (Japanese Wikipedia)

References

External links
Shin'ichiro Sakurai - Nissan Legends 04 (nissan-global.com)
Start of the Skyline Legend (nissan-global.com)

1929 births
2011 deaths
Japanese automotive engineers
Nissan people
People from Kanagawa Prefecture
Yokohama National University alumni
Academic staff of Tokai University